Calliptamus siciliae, commonly known as the pygmy pincer grasshopper, is a species of short-horned grasshoppers belonging to the family Acrididae subfamily Calliptaminae.

Distribution
This endemism is only present in the south-east of France, in Switzerland, in mainland Italy and in Sicily (hence the Latin name siciliae).

Habitat
It prefers dense vegetation.

Description
The basic coloration of the body is rather variable. It ranges from dark gray, greyish brown to reddish brown. The wings are narrow and dark spotted. The hind wings are transparent milky. The tibiae of the hindlegs and the underside of the femurs are reddish. It can be distinguished from similar species by the front wings (tegmina) shorter than the abdomen.

Biology
Adults can mainly be encountered from July through October.

Bibliography
Baccetti [Ed.] (1987), Evolutionary Biology of Orthopteroid Insects (Ellis Horwood series in entomology and acarology), Ellis Horwood Ltd., Chichester, England 612 pp. 
Fontana, Buzzetti, Cogo & Odé (2002), Guida al riconoscimento e allo studio di cavallette, grilli, mantidi e insetti affini del Veneto: Blattaria, Mantodea, Isoptera, Orthoptera, Phasmatodea, Dermaptera, Embidiina, Museo Naturalistico Archaeologico di Vicenza, Vicenza 1-592 
Harz (1975) Die Orthopteren Europas II, Series Entomologica (Ser. Entomol.) 11:1-939, 3519 figs. 
Herrera (1982) Catalogue of the Orthoptera of Spain, Series Entomologica (Ser. Entomol.) 22:1-162 
Jago (1963) A revision of the genus Calliptamus Serville (Orthoptera: Acrididae), Bulletin of the British Museum (Natural History) Entomology (Bull. Br. Mus. (Nat. Hist.) Ent.) 13(9):289-350 
La Greca, Di Marco, Laurenzi & Osella In Osella, Biondi, Di Marco & Riti [Ed.] (1997) 9. Blattaria, Mantodea, Phasmodea, Orthoptera, Dermaptera (Insecta) [in Italian], Ricerche sulla Valle Peligna (Italia Centrale, Abruzzo) [Researches in the Peligna Valley (Central Italy, Abruzzo)], Amministrazione Provinciale, L'Aquila 1:155-173 
Llorente del Moral (1982[1983]) La subfamilia Calliptaminae en Espana (Orthoptera: Catantopidae) (in Spanish with English summary), Eos, Revista española de Entomología (Eos) 58:171-192 
OrthopteraSF: Orthoptera Species File. Eades D.C., Otte D., Cigliano M.M., Braun H., 2010-04-28
Ramme (1927) Die Dermapteren und Orthopteren Siziliens und Kretas, mit kritischen Beiträgen und Revision aus den Gattungen Hololampra Sauss., Arcometopa Fieb., Pholidoptera Br., Platycleis Fieb., u.a., Eos, Revista española de Entomología (Eos) 3:111-200, 5 pls. 
Voisin [Ed.] (2003) Atlas des Orthoptères et des Mantides de France, Patrimoines Naturels 60:1-104

References

External links
 Orthoptera Species

Acrididae
Insects described in 1927
Orthoptera of Europe